Acraea lumiri is a butterfly in the family Nymphalidae. It is found from Cameroon to the central part of the Democratic Republic of the Congo.

Description

A. lumiri Baker (60 g). Wings above with orange-red markings; subapical band of the forewing 
broad and rounded; the hindmarginal spot is very large, reaches the base of cellules 1 a to 2, almost entirely covers the cell and also forms a small spot in cellule 3; the hindwing above almost to the base orange-red with uniform marginal band 2 mm. in breadth and occasionally with some black basal dots. Hindwing beneath yellow with black basa1 and discal dots but without red spots in the basal area and with uniformly curved black marginal band, which encloses large whitish grey marginal spots. Expanse about 34 mm. Cameroons and Congo.

Taxonomy
Acraea lumiri is a member of the Acraea bonasia species group; see Acraea.

See also Pierre & Bernaud, 2014

References

External links

Images representing  Acraea lumiri at Bold.

Butterflies described in 1908
lumiri